Barker Nunatak is one of the Grossman Nunataks, located  northeast of the Fletcher Nunataks. It was named by the Advisory Committee on Antarctic Names after Kenneth Barker, a United States Geological Survey (USGS) cartographer who, with James B. Fletcher, formed the USGS satellite surveying team at South Pole Station, winter party 1977.

See also
 Fletcher Nunataks

References 

Nunataks of Palmer Land